Transcription factor Dp-2 is a protein that in humans is encoded by the TFDP2 gene.

References

Further reading

External links